Acharya (Bengali: আচার্য) (Odia : ଆଚାର୍ଯ୍ୟ) is a surname or upādhi mainly found in the South Asian countries of India and Nepal.Acharyas also widely known for their war strategies as many of them shows great skills in ancient war of Hindu stories. They are also called Warrior Brahmins. In India, it is commonly found among the Vishwabrahmin and Brahmin communities in the Indian states of Gujarat, Maharashtra, Karnataka, Odisha, West Bengal, Tripura, Assam, Tamil Nadu, Kerala, Andhra Pradesh and Telangana. In Nepal its mainly found among the Bahun community. In Nepal, their population is spread in almost all parts of the country.

Notable people 
 Adishankaracharya, person to found Advaita vedanta
 Baburam Acharya (1888–1971), Nepalese historian and writer
 Bhakta Raj Acharya, Nepalese singer
 Bhanubhakta Acharya, Nepalese poet
 Bhim Acharya, Nepalese politician
 Bhimarjun Acharya, Nepalese famous advocate and constitutionalist.
 Binayak Acharya, former Chief Minister of Odissa, India
 Bodhraj Acharya, Nepalese scientist
 Dhananjaya Acharya, Nepalese business person  
 Dilaram Acharya, Nepalese politician
 Dilliram Sharma Acharya, Bhutanese-Nepalese poet
 Drona Prasad Acharya, Nepalese politician
 Ganesh Acharya, Indian choreographer
 Gyan Chandra Acharya, Nepalese diplomat
 Hari Bansha Acharya, Nepalese comedian and actor
 Jagannath Acharya, Nepalese freedom fighter, and former cabinet minister
 Kanak Mani Acharya Dixit, Nepalese renowned journalist and philanthropist
 Kamal Mani Acharya Dixit, Renowned linguist and writer in Nepali language
 Lekh Nath Acharya, Nepalese politician
 M. P. T. Acharya, Indian politician and co-founder of the Communist Party of India
 Madhu Raman Acharya, Nepalese diplomat and former secretary
 Mahesh Acharya, Nepalese politician and former cabinet minister
 Narahari Acharya, Nepalese politician and former cabinet minister
 Padmapani Acharya (1969–1999), Indian Army officer
 Pramod Acharya, Nepalese Advocate and Member of anti-corruption movement.
 Prasanna Acharya, Indian politician
 Sandeep Acharya, Indian singer, Indian idol of season 2
 Satya - Swaroop Raj Acharya, Nepalese singers
 Shailaja Acharya, former Deputy Prime Minister of Nepal
 Shridhar Acharya, Renowned Nepali Hotelier and hospitality baron
 Srikanta Acharya, Indian singer, songwriter and music director
 Shri Krishna Acharya, Nepalese industrialist and former member of parliament
 Suresh Acharya, Nepalese RTI advocate, author and politician
 Surya Raj Acharya, Nepali politician, professor, development expert and author
 Suryakant Acharya, Indian politician
 Tanka Prasad Acharya, former Prime Minister of Nepal
 Triveni Acharya, Indian journalist
 V. S. Acharya, Indian politician from Karnataka
 Vijay Krishna Acharya, Indian film director, scriptwriter
 Viral Acharya, Indian economist
 Yagya Prasad Acharya, Nepalese renowned ideologue, story writer and politician.

References 

Nepali-language surnames
Khas surnames